Diathrausta angustella is a moth in the family Crambidae. It was described by Harrison Gray Dyar Jr. in 1913. It is found in Panama.

References

Moths described in 1913
Taxa named by Harrison Gray Dyar Jr.
Spilomelinae